Party of Revolutionary Communism (in Russian: Партия революционного коммунизма) was a political party in Russia. It was formed by a Narodnik group which broke away from the Left Socialist-Revolutionaries after the latter's mutiny in July 1918. In September 1918, they constituted themselves as a party at a congress in Moscow. The party favoured co-operation with the Russian Communist Party (bolsheviks), and pledged support for Soviet power.

The party published Volya Truda (Воля Труда, Will of Labour), which was published as a daily newspaper from September 14 to December 4, 1918. From December 29, 1918, the daily newspaper was replaced by a periodical with the same title.

Vladimir Lenin perceived their programme as remaining on the platform of Narodnik utopianism and muddled and eclectic. While recognising that Soviet rule created preconditions for the establishment of a socialist system, the party denied the necessity of the proletarian dictatorship during the transitional period from capitalism to socialism. Throughout its existence, certain of its groups broke away from the party. Some of them joined the Russian Communist Party (B) such as Andrei Kolegayev, Anastasia Bitsenko, M. Dobrokhotov, and Alexei Ustinov, whereas others rejoined the Left Social-Revolutionaries. Two representatives of the Party of Revolutionary Communism were allowed to attend the Second Congress of the Comintern, in a deliberative capacity, but with no votes. In September 1920, following the Congress decision that there must be a single Communist Party in each country, the Party of Revolutionary Communism decided to join the R.C.P (B). In October of the same year, the R.C.P (B) Central Committee permitted Party organisations to enroll members of the former Party of Revolutionary Communism in the R.C.P.(B).

Sources
 V.I Lenin; Left-Wing Communism: An Infantile Disorder
 V.I. Lenin to J.A. Berzin

External links
 Archives of the Petrograd branch of the party

1918 establishments in Russia
1920 disestablishments in Russia
Defunct communist parties in Russia
Narodniks
Political parties of the Russian Revolution
Political parties established in 1918
Political parties disestablished in 1920